Princess Charlotte was launched in 1815 at Whitehaven. She made several voyages to India, sailing under a license issued by the British East India Company (EIC). She was last listed in 1841, though she apparently sailed for at least another two years.

Career
Princess Charlotte first appeared in Lloyd's Register (LR) in 1815.

In 1813 the EIC had lost its monopoly on the trade between India and Britain. British ships were then free to sail to India or the Indian Ocean under a license from the EIC.

Captain J.M'Kean sailed under a license from the EIC on 8 February 1816 from London, bound for Bombay. Thereafter she made several voyages to India and Penang.

On 1 September 1824 she put back to Calcutta to repair, after having sailed for Liverpool.

Fate
Princess Charlotte, King, master, was last listed in LR in 1841. However, she was reported to have sailed from St Helena on 28 July 1843, having come from Bombay on her way to Liverpool. She arrived at Liverpool on 21 September. She may have sailed again but absent original research her ultimate fate is unclear.

Citations and references
Citations

References
 

1815 ships
Age of Sail merchant ships of England